Grupo Desportivo de Basquete de Leça (GDBL) is a Portuguese basketball club, based in Leça da Palmeira.

Basketball teams in Portugal
Sport in Matosinhos